Gareth Maule (born in Pontypool, Wales on 4 December 1987) is a Welsh rugby union player currently playing at Centre. He attended New College School Cardiff and St Albans RC High School. He is 191 cm tall and weighs 95 kg.

Maule has been capped for Wales at U16, U18, U19 and U20 over 20 times.

In May 2009, it was announced that Maule had signed for the Scarlets from Newport Gwent Dragons. Maule has previously played for Ebbw Vale RFC, Newport RFC Cross Keys RFC and Bristol Rugby.

References

External links
Newport profile
 Scarlets Profile

Welsh rugby union players
Dragons RFC players
Scarlets players
1987 births
Living people
Rugby union players from Pontypool
Rugby union centres